Hypephyra is a genus of moths in the family Geometridae.

Species
 Hypephyra brunneiplaga (Swinhoe, 1902)
 Hypephyra charitopis Prout
 Hypephyra speciosa Yazaki
 Hypephyra terrosa Butler
 Hypephyra undilinea Bastelberger

References

Geometridae